Thomas O'Hanlon ( – 7 May 1897) was an Irish Nationalist politician who served as Member of Parliament (MP) for East Cavan from 1885 to 1892.

He was a native of Newry and became a wholesale and retail grocer in Derry.  He was a member of the Board of Poor Law Guardians in Newry and a member of the Town Council in Derry.

He was elected unopposed as Nationalist MP for East Cavan at the 1885 general election and returned unopposed for the same seat in 1886.  When the Irish Parliamentary Party split in December 1890 over the leadership of Charles Stewart Parnell, O'Hanlon supported Parnell.  However he did not seek re-election in the general election of 1892.  He later stood as a candidate for Dublin Corporation in the Rotunda ward on 24 December 1895, but failed by 85 votes to win the seat.

He died of acute pneumonia at his home in North Frederick Street, Dublin, on 7 May 1897, having been attended in the earlier stages of his illness by his former Parnellite Parliamentary colleague Dr J. E. Kenny. He was unmarried.

Footnotes

Sources
Irish Times, 26 December 1895 and 8 May 1897
The Times (London), 30 June 1886
 Brian M. Walker (ed.), Parliamentary Election Results in Ireland, 1801-1922, Dublin, Royal Irish Academy, 1978

External links
 

1830s births
1897 deaths
Members of the Parliament of the United Kingdom for County Cavan constituencies (1801–1922)
UK MPs 1885–1886
UK MPs 1886–1892
Irish Parliamentary Party MPs
Parnellite MPs
People from Newry
Politicians from Derry (city)